The Hendricks Formation is a geologic formation in Michigan. It preserves fossils dating back to the Silurian period.

References
 

Silurian Michigan